Likud Pride is a conservative LGBT organization founded in 2011 and linked to the Israeli right-wing Likud party. The group's chairman, who is also one of its founders, is Amir Ohana; he was designated in 2015 as the Likud's first openly gay member of the Knesset, and also of the Israeli right-wing.

They see themselves as a group with a Zionist and national liberal ideology, that integrates the values of the political party to which they belong.

The group contributes actively to participate in different public manifestations in favor of the rights of the LGBT people in Israel, such as pride parades and festivals, as well as the LGBT Day in the Knesset.

References

External links 
 Official website (in Hebrew)

LGBT political advocacy groups in Israel
LGBT affiliate organizations of political parties
LGBT conservatism
Organizations established in 2011
Likud